The Development Fraction was a parliamentary group in the Indonesian People's Representative Council. It was formed after the 1955 parliamentary election, by seven independents elected on Communist Party of Indonesia tickets.

References

Communist Party of Indonesia
Defunct political parties in Indonesia
Liberal democracy period in Indonesia
Parliamentary groups
Political parties with year of disestablishment missing
Political parties with year of establishment missing